Paul L. Selby, Jr. (1924-1999) was the dean and a professor emeritus of law at the West Virginia University College of Law.  Selby was also a member of the 1942 National Championship Ohio State Buckeyes football team.

Career

Selby begin his legal career in private practice in Columbus, Ohio, where he specialized in personal injury and medical malpractice defense for ten years. In 1957, Selby became a member of the Ohio State University Moritz College of Law faculty, serving as a professor, assistant dean and director of legal clinics. In 1964, Selby became the Dean of the West Virginia University College of Law.  He served as Dean until 1972, when he resigned to concentrate on teaching. He retired in 1989 and was named professor emeritus. The West Virginia University College of Law honored him with the Justicia Officium Award in 1996.

Education

Selby earned his bachelor's degree cum laude from Ohio State University in 1944.  He then received his law degree cum laude from Ohio State University's Moritz College of Law in 1947, where he was president of the Student Bar Association, business manager of the Ohio State Law Journal, a member of Phi Delta Phi and graduated Order of the Coif.

References

External links

Lawyers from Columbus, Ohio
Ohio State Buckeyes football players
Ohio State University alumni
Ohio State University Moritz College of Law alumni
Moritz College of Law faculty
West Virginia University College of Law faculty
Deans of law schools in the United States
1924 births
1999 deaths
American legal scholars
20th-century American lawyers
20th-century American academics